Huachinera is the municipal seat of Huachinera Municipality in the northeast of the Mexican state of Sonora.

It was founded as Juan Evangelista de Huachinera in 1645 by the Spanish missionary Cristóbal García. The land now occupied by the municipality was once the home of the Ópata Indians. 

Agriculture and cattle raising are the two main economic activities.  Corn and beans are raised for subsistence while grasses are grown for cattle fodder. The cattle herd had 15,457 head in 2000, and calves are exported to the United States. There is one mine, Santa Gertrudis, which has brought employment to the region.

References

External links
 Enciclopedia de los Municipios de Mexico

Populated places in Sonora